The 2000–01 Florida Gators men's basketball team represented the University of Florida in the sport of basketball during the 2000–01 college basketball season.  The Gators competed in Division I of the National Collegiate Athletic Association (NCAA) and the Eastern Division of the Southeastern Conference (SEC).  They were led by head coach Billy Donovan, and played their home games in the O'Connell Center on the university's Gainesville, Florida campus.

The Gators were the SEC regular season champions, winning a share of the title with a 12–4 conference record.  Despite having four players undergo surgery during the year, and starting off 1-3 in conference play, they rebounded to capture the school's first ever back-to-back SEC championships.  They earned a three seed in the 2001 NCAA tournament and advanced to the Second Round before losing to Temple.  The Gators won an opening round game in the NCAA Tournament for a school record third consecutive year.

Roster

Coaches

Schedule and results

|-
!colspan=9 style=| Regular Season

|-
!colspan=9 style=| SEC Tournament

|-
!colspan=9 style=| NCAA Tournament

Rankings

References 

Florida Gators men's basketball seasons
Florida
Florida
Florida Gators men's basketball team
Florida Gators men's basketball team